The Millennium Gate Museum (also known as The Gate) is a triumphal arch and Georgia history museum located in Atlanta, on 17th Street in the Atlantic Station district of Midtown. The monument celebrates peaceful accomplishment.

History
The Millennium Gate Museum opened July 4, 2008, and cost approximately $20 million.  CollinsCooperCarusi, Atlanta were the architects of record. Lady Henrietta Spencer-Churchill was the curator of the period rooms. Tunnell and Tunnell were the landscape architects. The arch had originally been intended for a location in Washington, DC, but failed to gain sufficient official support. 

The design is embellished with sculptural allegory by Scottish sculptor Alexander Stoddart, telling the story of peaceful accomplishment of the last 2000 years. Stoddart's Peace and Justice Gates flanking the arch were given the 2006 Palladio Prize for best American design of a public space.

The arch inscription reads, in Latin: "This American monument was built to commemorate all peaceful accomplishment since the birth of Jesus Christ in the year of our Lord, MM."

The response to the museum was mixed, with critics claiming that the design was inappropriate to the site, but the building is gaining acceptance over time.

Museum and collections

The Museum houses  of gallery space.  They are arranged in a series of Savannah double parlors by century, the enfilade created as a result ends at an exedra cloister with a monumental bronze bust of President George Washington.  

Beginning with pre-Columbian Native American history and 16th century Spanish settlement of the coast, the 18th Century Georgia Pioneer Gallery focuses on General James Oglethorpe's creation of the Colony of Georgia. The gallery contains documents and historical artifacts from the American Indian, Spanish, British Colonial, and American Revolutionary periods.

The 19th and 20th Century galleries narrate the story of Atlanta's and Georgia's early history. The exhibition features photographs and artifacts from twenty of Atlanta's pioneering families.

In partnership with Georgia Tech's Interactive Media Technology Center, the museum has created the 21st Century Interactive Gallery, allows visitors to explore Atlanta and how philanthropy has changed the city over time.

The Millennium Gate features three period rooms: an 18th-century Colonial study from Georgia's Declaration of Independence signer Lyman Hall's Midway, Georgia, the 19th century office of Coca-Cola magnate Thomas K. Glenn during his tenure as president of Atlantic Steel and the Trust Company of Georgia simultaneously, and the 20th century drawing room of Pink House, the Rhodes-Robinson home designed by Philip T. Shutze and Edward Vason Jones.

Selected exhibitions
 July 2009 - December 2009: Transcending Vision: American Impressionism 1870-1940
 January 2010 - December 2010: A Portal to The Past and Future - Travel Through the History of Georgia
 October 2011 - November 2011: WAVES: New Paintings by Peter Polites
 October 2014-February 2015: The Art of Diplomacy: Winston Churchill and the Pursuit of Painting

Usage
The property is offered for rental for private events, during which photography is permitted by the tenant.  Though a popular tourist subject of photographs, the property has an unpublished policy prohibiting photography with 'professional' equipment (even from the public street and sidewalk surrounding the property) which is expressed and enforced through actively patrolling private security. This is, of course, not legally enforceable.

Gallery

References

External links

 The Gate Atlanta website

Museums in Atlanta
Landmarks in Atlanta
Museums established in 2008
Triumphal arches in the United States
History museums in Georgia (U.S. state)
Novelty buildings in Georgia (U.S. state)
2008 establishments in Georgia (U.S. state)
New Classical architecture